The G.I.R.O.S. Italian Group for Research on Hardy Orchids (Gruppo Italiano per la Ricerca sulle Orchidee Spontanee), is an Italian naturalistic association of social promotion (non-profit) founded in 1994 by Italian naturalist Paolo Liverani, who died in 2005, and other naturalists of Tuscany and Emilia Romagna.

Objectives 
The GIROS promotes the knowledge, study and protection of Italian hardy orchids and is part of the European Orchid Council (EOC). Distributed throughout the Italian national territory, it is divided into sections. It organizes excursions, conventions, conferences and photographic exhibitions.

Magazine 
The GIROS publishes the quarterly magazine GIROS News  with color photos, information on the activities of the association and its sections, articles on botanical reports, popular science, literature reviews and national and international specialist literature. The first twenty-two issues of the magazine (1995–2003) are available online, only the cover and the index for the subsequent issues.

Sections 
 Sezione Alta Toscana (Apuane, Versilia, Lunigiana, Garfagnana)
 Sezione Calabra Reggina
 Sezione Calabra Silana
 Sezione Colli Berici
 Sezione Etruria Meridionale (Viterbo)
 Sezione Fiorentina
 Sezione Livornese
 Sezione Lucana
 Sezione Monte Baldo
 Sezione Murgiana
 Sezione Pratese
 Sezione Sardegna Centrale
 Sezione Sicilia Centrale
 Sezione Tarantina
 Sezione Tridentina
 Sezione Tyrrhena
 Sezione Umbria
 Sezione Vallo di Diano - Cilento (Salerno)
 Sezione Salento

Publications
In 2009, the G.I.R.O.S. has published a monograph on the Italian hardy orchids. The book was produced by the experts group, which includes the major Italian specialists in this fascinating group of plants. It is the first monograph on the Italian orchids updated to the latest molecular and taxonomy research. Specific introductory chapters are devoted to morphology, biology, systematics and taxonomy, biogeography, ecology and protection. The main body of the book contains cards of all 29 genres and all 189 species and subspecies known to the Italian country. The more complex types are also described in a dichotomous key. Each species is described with a card with detailed information on the distribution, the flowering period, a detailed description of the morphological and biology, and many images that illustrate both the whole plant, and the details, both the color variations. The volume concludes with an extensive bibliography, a glossary and index analysis.

See also 
 Giardino delle Orchidee Spontanee del Mediterraneo
 List of botanical gardens in Italy
 List of Orchidaceae genera
 Orchid of the Year

References

External links 
 Home page of Gruppo Italiano per la Ricerca sulle Orchidee Spontanee
 Official Forum of Gruppo Italiano per la Ricerca sulle Orchidee Spontanee
 Home page of the Sardinia Section

Scientific organisations based in Italy
Orchid organizations
1994 establishments in Italy
Organizations established in 1994